Alcetas II (313–306 ВС), king of Epirus, was the son of Arybbas, and grandson of Alcetas I. On account of his ungovernable temper, he was banished by his father, who appointed his younger son, Aeacides, to succeed him. On the death of Aeacides, who was killed in a battle fighting against Cassander in 313 BC, the Epirotes recalled Alcetas. Cassander sent an army against him under the command of Lyciscus, but in 312 BC entered into an alliance with him. The Epirotes, incensed at the outrages of Alcetas, rose against him and put him to death, together with his two sons.  As a result, in 306 BC Pyrrhus, the son of Aeacides, was placed upon the throne by his protector King Glaukias of the Illyrians.

References

Pausanias (i. 11. § 5)
Diodorus (xix. 88, 89)
Plutarchus (Pyrrhus of Epirus 3.)

Sources

Rulers of Ancient Epirus
4th-century BC Greek people
4th-century BC rulers